Florence County is a county located in the U.S. state of South Carolina. As of the 2020 census, its population was 137,059. Its county seat is Florence.

Florence County is included in the Florence, SC Metropolitan Statistical Area. The county's population is about 60% urban.

History
Florence County was formed from main sections of Darlington and Marion Counties plus other townships from Williamsburg and Clarendon Counties, starting in 1888. The last section of Williamsburg County was not added until 1921.  Florence County was named for the daughter of General W. W. Harlee. On December 26, 1921, Bill McAllister was lynched for having an affair with a white woman.

Geography

State and local protected areas 
 Lynches River County Park
 Moore Farms Botanical Garden (part)
 Pee Dee Station Site Wildlife Management Area
 Woods Bay State Park (part)

Major water bodies 
 Great Pee Dee River
 Lynches River

Adjacent counties 
 Williamsburg County – south
 Marion County – east
 Dillon County – north
 Marlboro County – north
 Darlington County – northwest
 Lee County – west
 Sumter County – southwest
 Clarendon County – southwest

Major highways 

 
 
 
 
 
 
 
 
 
  (Truck Route)

Major infrastructure 
 Florence Regional Airport
 Florence Station

Demographics

2020 census

As of the 2020 United States Census, there were 137,059 people, 53,047 households, and 35,763 families residing in the county.

2010 census
At the 2010 census, there were 136,885 people, 52,653 households, and 36,328 families living in the county. The racial makeup of the county was 54.9% white, 41.3% black or African American, 1.2% Asian, 0.3% American Indian, 1.1% from other races, and 1.1% from two or more races. Those of Hispanic or Latino origin made up 2.2% of the population. In terms of ancestry, 8.4% were American, 7.8% were English, 6.7% were Irish, and 6.2% were German.

Of the 52,653 households, 35.2% had children under the age of 18 living with them, 44.7% were married couples living together, 19.6% had a female householder with no husband present, 31.0% were non-families, and 26.3% of households were made up of individuals. The average household size was 2.54 and the average family size was 3.06. The median age was 37.6 years.

The median household income was $40,487 and the median family income  was $48,896. Males had a median income of $38,934 versus $30,163 for females. The per capita income for the county was $21,932. About 14.5% of families and 18.0% of the population were below the poverty line, including 26.1% of those under age 18 and 14.0% of those age 65 or over.

2000 census
At the 2000 census there were 125,761 people, 47,147 households, and 33,804 families living in the county.  The population density was 157 people per square mile (61/km2). There were 51,836 housing units at an average density of 65 per square mile (25/km2).  The racial makeup of the county was 58.65% White, 39.34% Black or African American, 0.22% Native American, 0.70% Asian, 0.02% Pacific Islander, 0.39% from other races, and 0.68% from two or more races.  1.10% of the population were Hispanic or Latino of any race.
Of the 47,147 households 33.80% had children under the age of 18 living with them, 49.70% were married couples living together, 18.10% had a female householder with no husband present, and 28.30% were non-families. 24.50% of households were one person and 8.20% were one person aged 65 or older.  The average household size was 2.59 and the average family size was 3.08.

The age distribution was 25.90% under the age of 18, 9.70% from 18 to 24, 28.90% from 25 to 44, 23.60% from 45 to 64, and 11.80% 65 or older.  The median age was 36 years. For every 100 females, there were 88.70 males.  For every 100 females age 18 and over, there were 84.20 males.

The median household income was $35,144 and the median family income  was $41,274. Males had a median income of $32,065 versus $21,906 for females. The per capita income for the county was $17,876.  About 13.50% of families and 16.40% of the population were below the poverty line, including 22.30% of those under age 18 and 16.50% of those age 65 or over.

In census 2000, the population of Florence County was classified as 58% urban and 42% rural, containing the two urban areas of Florence (2000 pop. 67,314) and Lake City (8,728). Along with Darlington County, it comprises part of the Florence Metropolitan Statistical Area.

Law and government

Law enforcement
In 2020, Florence County Sheriff Kenney Boone pled guilty to embezzlement and misconduct in office. He was not sentenced to jail time.  the current sheriff is T.J. Joye.

Politics

Communities

Cities
 Florence (county seat and largest city)
 Johnsonville
 Lake City

Towns

 Coward
 Olanta
 Pamplico
 Quinby
 Scranton
 Timmonsville

Census-designated places
 Danwood

Other unincorporated communities
 Cartersville
 Effingham
 Evergreen
 Hannah
 Kingsburg
 Mars Bluff
 Poston

Notable people
People born in Florence County:
Donald Henry Gaskins (1933-1991), serial killer
Roger K. Kirby (born 1960), politician
Kent Lee (1923-2017), Navy admiral
Georganna Sinkfield (born 1943), politician

See also
 List of counties in South Carolina
 National Register of Historic Places listings in Florence County, South Carolina
 Chaloklowa Chickasaw, state-recognized group that resides in the county

References

Further reading

External links

 
 
 Florence County History and Images

 
1888 establishments in South Carolina
Populated places established in 1888
Florence, South Carolina metropolitan area